Itū'au, together with Aitūlagi, make up the village of Malaeloa (long ceremonial-green).

Aitūlagi is the name of the famed family of high orator chiefs (tama matua) from the Leāsina county.

Itū'au along with the villages of Fūtiga, Taputimu and Vailoatai form the itūmalo (county/district) o Tuālātai.

Although Itū'au and Aitūlagi align themselves with different counties, today they operate together in many respects as one village under the name of Malaeloa.

Tutuila Deed of Cession

Amituana'i of Itū'au was a signatory to the Tutuila Deed of Cession of 1900.

Etymology

Itū’au can literally be translated as "war side". The itū'au and the alātaua (war path) were roles assumed by allied villages or districts during times of conflict. This was a common practice throughout pre-contact Samoa, with its roots in the first Mālietoa government.
The function of the itū’au role can be described as a "controller of troops", whereas the alātaua role can be described as a "director of wars". These functions were carried out by the tulafale (talking chiefs) of the villages or districts designated with these respective roles.

Historical Sites

The Malaeloa Itū'au Olo Site (or defensive fortification), which was nominated for the National Register of Historic Places in 2015, is supported by Samoan cultural histories and oral traditions relating to interregional conflicts and defenses against cannibalism during pre-contact periods. It was built to protect villagers from Tuife'ai, the legendary cannibal king of Tutuila, and his aumaga (army).

Demographics

References 

Villages in American Samoa
Tutuila